Rohteichthys microlepis is a species of cyprinid fish found in the countries of Sumatra and Borneo (Indonesia).  It is the only member of its genus.

References
 

Cyprinid fish of Asia
Freshwater fish of Sumatra
Freshwater fish of Borneo
Fish described in 1859